Northwest District Park is a public park in Chatham County, North Carolina in the United States, operated by the Chatham County Parks and Recreation Department.

Amenities include an outdoor swimming pool, lake with rental paddle boats, multipurpose field for soccer, ultimate, football, rugby, and other field sports, youth activity building, picnic pavilions, restrooms, outdoor basketball court, reception/meeting building with lake view, playground, 1 mile walking trail, and parking.

The trail winds through mature hardwood forests.  

Events include a Summer Camp: A week-long, full-day summer camp for ages 5-14, and movies in the park.

References

External links
 on Google Maps
Chatham County: Parks & Recreation

Parks in North Carolina
Protected areas of Chatham County, North Carolina